Norðskáli is a settlement in the Faroe Islands on the island of Eysturoy, a few kilometres north of Oyri.

Its name means north dwelling and its population is 330.

The 226-metre Streymin Bridge crosses Sundini from the island of Streymoy between Norðskáli and Oyri. Since the bridge was opened in 1976, a settlement named Oyrarbakki has grown up near the bridge, with a large school, shops and a post office.

Gallery

References

Populated places in the Faroe Islands